Alta Vášová (born 27 May 1939 in Vynohradiv) in a Slovak sci-fi writer, film and television writer and child stories author.

Life 
Vášová studied Mathematics and Physics Teaching at the Comenius University (then called Higher School of Pedagogy in Bratislava). In addition to writing, she worked as writer in Koliba, Bratislava and Barrandov, Prague. She also  worked as a cleaner and guide at the Zvíkov Castle. Between 1968 - 1973 she was a dramaturgist at the Slovak Public Television.

Vášová lives in Bratislava. She was formerly married to the architect Dimitrij Jurkovič. The marriage resulted in twins Ilja and Dušan. Her second husband is the literature critic Peter Zajac with whom she has twins Marek and Matúš.

Works 
Vášová  published in literature magazines Mladá Tvorba, Romboid and Slovenské rozhľady. She focuses on civilizational, ecological, biographic and sci-fi genres as well as relationships between children and parents. She received Anasoft litera prize for her 2008 novel Ostrovy nepamäti (Islands of unmemory) and Dominik Tatarka prize for 2019 novel Odlety (Departures). In 2018, the president of Slovakia Andrej Kiska awarded her the Order of Ľudovít Štúr, 2nd class. 

She wrote the script of the popular television fairy tale Neberte nám princeznú (Let the Princess Stay with Us).

References

Slovak screenwriters
Slovak women writers
Slovak novelists
Living people
1939 births
Comenius University alumni
People from Vynohradiv